Cooper Mountain may refer to:

 Cooper Mountain (Colorado)
 Cooper Mountain (Oregon)
 Cooper Mountain (West Virginia)